T-type or Type T may refer to:

Automobiles
T-Type, a series of cars made by Buick in the 1980s
MG T-type, sports cars produced by MG from 1936 to 1955
AEC T-type, a bus produced in 1920

Other
Type T personality, a risk-taking personality described by Frank Farley
T-type asteroid, rare inner-belt asteroids of unknown composition 
T-type calcium channel, low voltage activated calcium channels
Bristol Biplane Type 'T', a 1911 airplane

See also
 T class (disambiguation)
 T series (disambiguation)